Rehri Goth is one of the neighborhoods of Landhi Town in Karachi, Sindh, Pakistan.

Demography
Rehri Goth is 400 hundred years old fishing community. Majority of people speak Sindhi on the coastal belt of Karachi Sindh. People from Rehri Goth, Ibrahim Hyderi, Dawood jat Basti, and Chashma goth are the bonafide of Karachi
There are several ethnic groups in Razzaqabad including Urdu,   
Sindhis, Muhajir, Punjabis, Kashmiris, Seraikis, Pakhtuns, Balochs, Brahuis, Memons etc.

References

External links 
 Karachi Website.

Neighbourhoods of Karachi